Carl August Julius Milde (2 November 1824 – 3 July 1871) was a German bryologist and pteridologist born in Breslau.

In 1850 he obtained his medical doctorate from the University of Breslau, where he was a student of Heinrich Göppert (1800-1884). From 1853, he was an Oberlehrer at a Realschule in Breslau.

Milde specialized in research of cryptogams, particularly mosses and ferns. The botanical genus Mildella from the family Pteridaceae was named in his honor by Vittore Benedetto Antonio Trevisan. In 1876, American botanical artist Charles Edward Faxon (1846-1918) published a translation of Milde's Botrychiorum Monographia. Other written works of his include:
 Die höheren Sporenpflanzen Deutschland's und der Schweiz, (The higher spore plants of Germany and Switzerland), 1865. 
 Bryologia silesiaca, (Silesian bryology), 1869.
Milde suffered from respiratory ailments for most of his adult life, and died at the age of 46 in Meran, location of a popular spa that he sometimes visited for treatment.

References 
 This article is based on a translation of an equivalent article at the German Wikipedia.
 Harvard University Library Faxon's Translations of Julius Milde's "Botrychiorum monographia".

19th-century German botanists
Bryologists
Pteridologists
Scientists from Wrocław
1824 births
1871 deaths
People from the Province of Silesia